The Three Witnesses is the collective name for three men connected with the early Latter Day Saint movement who stated that an angel had shown them the golden plates from which Joseph Smith translated the Book of Mormon; they also stated that they had heard God's voice, informing them that the book had been translated by divine power. The Three are part of twelve Book of Mormon witnesses, who also include Smith and the Eight Witnesses.

The joint statement of the Three Witnesses—Oliver Cowdery, Martin Harris, and David Whitmer—has been printed (with a separate statement by the Eight Witnesses) in nearly every edition of the Book of Mormon since its first publication in 1830. All three men eventually broke with Smith and the church he organized, although Harris and Cowdery were eventually rebaptized into the church after Smith's death. Whitmer founded his own Church of Christ (Whitmerite). All three men upheld their testimony of the Book of Mormon at their deaths.

Testimony of the Three Witnesses
On June 28, 1829, Joseph Smith, Oliver Cowdery, David Whitmer, and Martin Harris went into the woods near the home of Peter Whitmer Sr. and prayed to receive a vision of the golden plates.  After some time, Harris left the other three men, believing his presence had prevented the vision from occurring. The remaining three again knelt and said they soon saw a light in the air overhead and an angel holding the golden plates. Smith retrieved Harris, and after praying at some length with him, Harris too said he saw the vision.

The three men provided a single written statement titled "Testimony of Three Witnesses", published at the end of the first edition of the Book of Mormon:

Be it known unto all nations, kindreds, tongues, and people, unto whom this work shall come: That we, through the grace of God the Father, and our Lord Jesus Christ, have seen the plates which contain this record, which is a record of the people of Nephi, and also of the Lamanites, his brethren, and also of the people of Jared, who came from the tower of which hath been spoken. And we also know that they have been translated by the gift and power of God, for his voice hath declared it unto us; wherefore we know of a surety that the work is true. And we also testify that we have seen the engravings which are upon the plates; and they have been shewn unto us by the power of God, and not of man. And we declare with words of soberness, that an angel of God came down from heaven, and he brought and laid before our eyes, that we beheld and saw the plates, and the engravings thereon; and we know that it is by the grace of God the Father, and our Lord Jesus Christ, that we beheld and bear record that these things are true. And it is marvellous in our eyes. Nevertheless, the voice of the Lord commanded us that we should bear record of it; wherefore, to be obedient unto the commandments of God, we bear testimony of these things. And we know that if we are faithful in Christ, we shall rid our garments of the blood of all men, and be found spotless before the judgment-seat of Christ, and shall dwell with him eternally in the heavens. And the honor be to the Father, and to the Son, and to the Holy Ghost, which is one God. Amen.

The testimony was moved to the beginning of the Book of Mormon in later editions, with standardized spelling.

The Three Witnesses

The Three Witnesses were closely associated with Joseph Smith at the time he founded the church. Harris made a significant financial contribution to the printing of the Book of Mormon. In addition, it has been argued that Smith and the Witnesses had a similar magical worldview. Grant H. Palmer wrote that moderns "tend to read into [the Witnesses'] testimonies a rationalist perspective rather than a nineteenth-century magical mindset .... They shared a common world view, and this is what drew them together in 1829."

As a group, the Three Witnesses served only one other role in the church before they were excommunicated in 1837–38. After Smith had selected the council of the Twelve Apostles, the Three Witnesses "called out the twelve men and gave each one a blessing."

Oliver Cowdery 

Oliver Cowdery was a school teacher and an early convert to Mormonism who served as scribe while Smith dictated what he said was a translation of the Book of Mormon. Like Smith, who was a distant relative, Cowdery was also a treasure hunter who had used a divining rod in his youth. Cowdery asked questions of the rod; if it moved, the answer was yes, if not, no. Cowdery also told Smith that he had seen the golden plates in a vision before the two ever met.

Before Cowdery served as one of the Three Witnesses, he had already experienced two other important visions. Cowdery said that he and Smith had received the Aaronic priesthood from John the Baptist in May 1829, after which they had baptized each other in the Susquehanna River. Cowdery said that he and Smith later that year had gone into the forest and prayed "until a glorious light encircled us, and as we arose on account of the light, three persons stood before us dressed in white, their faces beaming with glory." Smith and Cowdery reported that one of the three persons stated he was the Apostle Peter and named the others James and John. The three laid their hands upon the heads of Cowdery and Smith and ordained them to the Melchizedek priesthood.

By 1838, Cowdery and Smith had a number of disagreements, including doctrinal differences about the role of faith and works, the Kirtland Safety Society, and what Cowdery called Smith's "dirty, nasty, filthy affair" with Fanny Alger. Smith's growing reliance on Sidney Rigdon as his first counselor and differences over the management of finances during the gathering of the Latter Day Saints in Jackson County and Kirtland as well as nine documented grievances, ultimately led to Cowdery's excommunication in April. Cowdery also refused a high council decision that he not sell lands on which he hoped to make a profit.

After Cowdery's excommunication on April 12, 1838, he taught school, practiced law, and became involved in Ohio political affairs. He joined the Methodist church in Tiffin, Ohio, and, according to a lay leader of that church, publicly declared that he was "ashamed of his connection with Mormonism." Later, Cowdery reaffirmed his role in the establishment of Mormonism, though he lost editorship of a newspaper as a result. In 1848, after Smith's assassination, Cowdery reaffirmed his witness to the golden plates and asked to be readmitted to the church. He never held another high office in the church, in part because he died sixteen months after his re-baptism.

Martin Harris 

Martin Harris was a respected farmer in the Palmyra area who had changed his religion at least five times before he became a Mormon. A biographer wrote that his "imagination was excitable and fecund." One letter says that Harris thought that a candle sputtering was the work of the devil and that he had met Jesus in the shape of a deer and walked and talked with him for two or three miles. The local Presbyterian minister called him "a visionary fanatic." A friend, who praised Harris as "universally esteemed as an honest man" but disagreed with his religious affiliation, declared that Harris's mind "was overbalanced by 'marvellousness'" and that his belief in earthly visitations of angels and ghosts gave him the local reputation of being crazy. Another friend said, "Martin was a good citizen. Martin was a man that would do just as he agreed with you. But, he was a great man for seeing spooks."

During the early years, Harris "seems to have repeatedly admitted the internal, subjective nature of his visionary experience." The foreman in the Palmyra printing office that produced the first Book of Mormon said that Harris "used to practice a good deal of his characteristic jargon and 'seeing with the spiritual eye,' and the like." John H. Gilbert, the typesetter for most of the Book of Mormon, said that he had asked Harris, "Martin, did you see those plates with your naked eyes?" According to Gilbert, Harris "looked down for an instant, raised his eyes up, and said, 'No, I saw them with a spiritual eye." Two other Palmyra residents said that Harris told them that he had seen the plates with "the eye of faith" or "spiritual eyes." In 1838, Harris is said to have told an Ohio congregation that "he never saw the plates with his natural eyes, only in vision or imagination." A neighbor of Harris in Kirtland, Ohio, said that Harris "never claimed to have seen [the plates] with his natural eyes, only spiritual vision."

One account states that in March 1838, Harris publicly denied that either he or the other Witnesses to the Book of Mormon had literally seen the golden plates—although, of course, he had not been present when Whitmer and Cowdery first stated they had viewed them. This account says that recantation of Harris, made during a period of crisis in early Mormonism, induced five influential members, including three apostles, to leave the church. Later in life, Harris strongly denied that he ever made this statement.

In 1837, Harris joined dissenters, led by Warren Parrish, in an attempt to reform the church. But Parrish rejected the Book of Mormon, and Harris continued to believe in it. By 1840, Harris had returned to Smith's church. Following Smith's assassination, Harris accepted James J. Strang as a new prophet, and Strang also claimed to have been divinely led to an ancient record engraved upon metal plates. By 1847, Harris had broken with Strang and had accepted the leadership of fellow Book of Mormon witness, Whitmer. Harris then left Whitmer for another Mormon factional leader, Gladden Bishop. In 1855, Harris joined with the last surviving brother of Joseph Smith, William, and declared that William was Joseph's true successor. In 1856, Harris was living in Kirtland and, as caretaker of the temple, gave tours to interested visitors.

Despite his earlier statements regarding the spiritual nature of his experience, in 1853, Harris told one David Dille that he had held the forty- to sixty-pound plates on his knee for "an hour-and-a-half" and handled them "plate after plate." Even later, Harris affirmed that he had seen the plates and the angel: "Gentlemen," holding out his hand, "do you see that hand? Are you sure you see it? Or are your eyes playing you a trick or something? No. Well, as sure as you see my hand so sure did I see the Angel and the plates."

In 1870, at the age of 87, Harris accepted an invitation to live in Utah Territory, where he was rebaptized into the Church of Jesus Christ of Latter-day Saints (LDS Church) and spent his remaining years with relatives in Cache County. In his last years, Harris continued to bear fervent testimony to the authenticity of the plates, but a contemporary critic of the church has noted that Harris rejected some important Mormon doctrines and that his sympathy for the LDS Church was tenuous. In a letter of 1870, Harris swore, "no man ever heard me in any way deny the truth of the Book of Mormon, the administration of the angel that showed me the plates, nor the organization of the Church of Jesus Christ of Latter Day Saints under the administration of Joseph Smith, Jun., the prophet whom the Lord raised up for that purpose in these the latter days, that he may show forth his power and glory."

David Whitmer 

David Whitmer first became involved with Joseph Smith and the golden plates through his friend, Cowdery, and became the most interviewed of the Three Witnesses because of his longevity. Whitmer gave various versions of his experience in viewing the golden plates. Although less credulous than Harris, Whitmer had his own visions and owned a seer stone. In 1829, before testifying to the truth of the golden plates, Whitmer reported that while traveling with Smith to his father's farm in Fayette, New York, they had seen a Nephite on the road who suddenly disappeared. Upon arrival at his father's house, they were "impressed" that the same Nephite was under the shed.

Recounting the vision to Orson Pratt in 1878, Whitmer claimed to have seen not only the golden plates but the, Brass Plates, "... the sword of Laban, the Directors and the Interpreters." On other occasions, Whitmer's vision of the plates seemed far less corporeal. When asked in 1880 for a description of the angel who showed him the plates, Whitmer said the angel "had no appearance or shape." Asked by the interviewer how he then could bear testimony that he had seen and heard an angel, Whitmer replied, "Have you never had impressions?" To which the interviewer responded, "Then you had impressions as the Quaker when the spirit moves, or as a good Methodist in giving a happy experience, a feeling?" "Just so," replied Whitmer.

James Henry Moyle, a young Mormon lawyer, interviewed Whitmer in 1885 and asked if there was any possibility that Whitmer had been deceived. "His answer was unequivocal ... that he saw the plates and heard the angel with unmistakable clearness."  But Moyle went away "not fully satisfied .... It was more spiritual than I anticipated."

In 1831, Whitmer moved with early Mormon believers to Kirtland, Ohio. In 1832, he followed the church to Jackson County, Missouri, and was named president of the church though he had criticized Smith's more recent innovations. By December 1837, a movement led by Warren Parrish plotted to overthrow Smith and replace him with Whitmer. After the collapse of the Kirtland Bank, confrontation grew between the dissenters and those loyal to Smith. Whitmer, his brother John, Cowdery, and others were harassed by the Danites, a secret group of Mormon vigilantes, and were warned to leave the county. Whitmer was formally excommunicated on April 13, 1838, and never rejoined the church.

Whitmer moved to Richmond, Missouri, where he ran a livery stable and became a civic leader. After Smith's assassination, Whitmer, like Martin Harris, briefly followed James Strang, who had his own set of supernatural metal plates. Later, Whitmer organized his own splinter group based on his authority as one of the Three Witnesses and even later supported another group headed by his brother, John. In his pamphlet, "An Address to All Believers in Christ" (1887), Whitmer reaffirmed his witness to the golden plates, but he also criticized Smith, including the introduction of plural marriage. "If you believe my testimony to the Book of Mormon, if you believe that God spake to us three witnesses by his own voice," wrote Whitmer, "then I tell you that in June, 1838, God spake to me again by his own voice from the heavens, and told me to 'separate myself from among the Latter Day Saints, for as they sought to do unto me, should it be done unto them.'" Nevertheless, Whitmer is regarded by Mormons as an "enduring witness to the genuineness of the prophet Joseph Smith and his message."

See also 
Reformed Egyptian

Notes

References

1829 in Christianity
1829 in New York (state)
1830 in Christianity
1830 in New York (state)
Angelic visionaries
3 witnesses
Doctrine and Covenants people
Fayette, New York
Trios